The Lola Mk4 and the derivative Mk4A were Formula One racing cars constructed by the Lola company in 1962. They were designed by Lola founder, owner and Chief Designer Eric Broadley at the request of Reg Parnell, proprietor of the Bowmaker Racing Team. The Mk4 was the first design that Lola produced for the top tier of motorsport.

History
Design of the car broadly followed Broadley's experience in the Formula Junior category, with a steel spaceframe chassis braced by bulkheads in front and behind the driver. The engine was carried within the chassis, and cooling was by a radiator mounted at the front of the bodywork; two tubes of the spaceframe acting as coolant pipes to and from the engine. Following supply delays with Coventry Climax's new V8 engine, the cars were initially built up around the older, inline 4-cylinder FPF engine.

The Mk4 had its first outing in the non-Championship 1962 Brussels Grand Prix where it qualified in the midfield but failed to finish. Its first World Championship race was the 1962 Dutch Grand Prix. By now the cars were fitted with the more powerful Climax FWMV V8 engine; the meeting went somewhat better with John Surtees qualifying his car in pole position. Once again though, poor reliability let the race performance down, and neither car reached the finishing line. Surtees took the car's first victory in the 2000 Guineas race at Mallory Park in the middle of the season, but excess chassis flex impeded his Championship hopes.

A stopgap solution to the flexing problems was to weld extra tubes around the cockpit of the Mk4. When the revised Mk4A was introduced its most significant difference was in a number of body panels that were welded to the chassis in what Lola described as a semi-monocoque design. With the uprated designs results continued to trickle in, but a lack of development funding stunted the cars competitive growth, and by the end of the season both the Mk4 and 4A were completely outclassed. It was only in Tasman Series racing, with the addition of the  version of the FPF straight-four, that the car showed some promise. Two such-equipped Mk4 cars were shipped to New Zealand and Australia for their respective Grands Prix in early 1963, where regular driver Surtees was partnered by up-and-coming South African Tony Maggs. In his last two races for the Bowmaker team, before signing with Ferrari, Surtees won the New Zealand Grand Prix and finished second in the Australian Grand Prix, a month later. Maggs failed to finish on either occasion.

With the withdrawal of Bowmaker, Reg Parnell Racing continued with the Mk4/4A cars into the 1963 World Championship season, but only as second-string cars behind new Coopers. One Mk4 was sold to privateer Bob Anderson who entered the car into many Championship and non-Championship races, winning the 1963 Rome Grand Prix.

Complete Formula One results
(key) (results in bold indicate pole position)

World Championship

† Mk4A chassis.

Non-Championship
(key)

† Mk4A chassis.
‡ Car ran with 4-cylinder FPF engine. On all other occasions the cars were fitted with the V8 FWMV engine.

References

 (German; race results)

Mk4
Tasman Series cars